Guruvunu Minchina Sishyudu is 1963 Indian Telugu-language fantasy film directed and produced by B. Vittalacharya starring Kantha Rao, Krishna Kumari, Kaikala Satyanarayana, Valluri Balakrishna in the lead roles.

Cast
 Kantha Rao as Vijeya
 Mukkamala as Kalaketu
 Krishna Kumari as Padmavathi
 Rajanala as Keertisena
 Kaikala Satyanarayana as Dharmapala
 Valluri Balakrishna as Ajeya

References

External links
 

1960s Telugu-language films
Indian fantasy films
Films directed by B. Vittalacharya
1960s fantasy films